Castleknock Castle is a ruined Norman castle located on the grounds of present-day all boys independent school Castleknock College, Castleknock, Dublin, Ireland.

Description

"The position of the castle is commanding, and its two deep ditches, and the ruins of its massive walls, bespeak its former strength. The Castle itself is thickly clad with ivy, and the entire hill covered with large and spreading trees. The whole is now reserved ground, enclosed with a strong fence. The solemn gloom of the place, its dark winding walks, and the profound silence that reigns around, make it a delightful solitude."

A mound may have preceded the present medieval Norman structure. The polygonal keep was the notable feature of the castle. Attached to it was a large squat building. A curtain wall, interspersed with towers, surrounded the castle.  There is a moat or ditch constructed around the castle. Today, the site is surrounded by trees while the ruins are seldom visible from the road except in winter. The earliest extant drawing of the castle by Francis Place also shows it in ruins, but somewhat less dilapidated than at present.

There is also a small mound to the west of Castleknock College buildings known as Windmill Hill. There is a water tower there now which was built originally as an observatory by a previous owner, Simon Guinn.

History

Cromlech
There is evidence of the site's importance prior to the erection of the castle in the Norman period. An ancient pagan cromlech was discovered.

"In the year 1861, an ancient Cromlech, or Druid's altar, was discovered in the interior of the old Castle when digging the grave of the Rev. Thomas Plunket.
The workmen, coming on a large flat stone, found it too heavy to remove, and immediately commenced to break it.
They succeeded after great difficulty, but on detaching a portion, they found, to their surprise, an empty space beneath, and a human skeleton lying at full length.
The head and larger bones were almost perfect, and with them were small heaps of dry, whitish dust. The men not understanding the nature of their discovery, placed the bones a little aside, and continued their work.
It was not till the grave was filled up, and it was too late to remedy the evil, that the whole matter came to light.
From the description given by different persons who were present, there is no doubt that the discovered grave was one of those ancient Cromlechs, or altar tombs, which were used as burial places for kings or notables during the Pagan times.
The skeleton in this case was so old that the admission of air caused a portion of the bones to fall into dust; this accounts for the small heaps of whitish dust which were found with the larger bones."

Cnucha
"In the year 726", say the Four Masters, " died Congalach of Cnucha." In the old translation of the annals of Clonmacnoisc, he is called " Konolagh of Castleknock." In the Annals of Ulster we read " Congalach Cnucho moritur; and in the Annals of Tigernach "Congalach Cnuchaensis moritur." We know nothing respecting Congalach, but that he died at his fort, Cnucha, towards the beginning of the eighth century."

Castle origins
The castle was founded by the Norman knight, Hugh Tyrrel, who was later created Baron of Castleknock. He chose this location near the end of the esker which stretches from Galway to Dublin. Built on two mounds of the esker, it commanded the route into Dublin from the west.

Castleknock was the final rallying point for the forces of the last High King of Ireland, Rory O'Connor. He failed to drive the Cambro-Normans from the area around Dublin in 1171.

At that time the old fort underwent many changes. Tyrrel strengthened his fortress with all the improvements of modern warfare, and in a short time the Norman castle stood aloft in grim defiance, with its heavy battlements and deep double ditch. The battering ram could not approach it, and the missiles thrown against it fell harmless to the ground 'as hailstones from the rounded shield.'

Foundation of abbey 
The Abbey of St. Brigid was founded where the Protestant church now stands, by Richard Tyrrell, second Baron of Castleknock, in 1184, and continued to flourish until the suppression of the monasteries, when it was demolished, and a Protestant church built on the site. In ancient times Castleknock furnished two canons to the Cathedral of St. Patrick, and still today two prebends of St. Patrick's derive their titles from "Castrum Noc ex parte diaconi, et Ca-strum Noc ex parte praecentoris".

Capture by Robert the Bruce
The Bruces advanced on Dublin (1316). A short time before, Edward Bruce had been crowned King of Ireland at Dundalk, and thinking the time had come for the expulsion of the English, he invited his brother Robert to his assistance. The King of Scotland landed in Ireland with a select body of troops, and, being joined by his brother, marched to besiege Dublin with 20,000 men. The first exploit on approaching the city was the taking of Castleknock. It could not be expected that the old fortress, long deemed impregnable, could long hold out against the hero of Bannockburn. Bruce entered, making Hugh Tyrrell prisoner, and fixed there his headquarters.

It was now believed that the liberation of Ireland was at hand. There was feasting and rejoicing in the Castle. The Irish and Scottish chieftains met at the same board, and plaids and bonnets mingled, with garments of saffron hue. But joy quickly gave place to gloom. Bruce soon perceived that Dublin was fully prepared for a siege, and well provided with provisions from the sea. Moreover, the ardour of the citizens caused him to relinquish all hope. After remaining a few days in the Castle, he released Tyrrell on payment of a ransom, and retired from the city. But he had scarcely commenced his march, when he seemed to repent of his
resolution, and halted again at Leixlip. After a short delay he recommenced his march towards the south, and soon after left Ireland, leaving his brother to continue the war.

Legend
"THE LADY OF THE CASTLE ; CTR THE STORY OF EIBHLEEN O'BRINN."
Of all the facts connected with the history of Castleknock,
there is none that has attracted more interest at least,
amongst a certain class than the story of Eibhleen O'Brinn.
Dr. Burton, in his History of the Royal Hospital, Kil-
mainham, has developed it into a tale of considerable length,
and an anonymous writer in the Nation has commemorated
the event in not ungraceful verse. The facts are as follows :

In the early part of the 16th century, Hugh Tyrrell, the
last of the name, ruled in Castleknock. During his absence,
his brother Roger, by his violence and licentiousness, made
the old castle the terror of the neighbourhood, and a
"stronghold of iniquity." One summer's evening, Roger
carried off Eibhleen, the fair daughter of O'Brinn, or O'Byrne,
a Wicklow chieftain, who dwelt on a hill to the west of the
neighbouring town of Chapelizod, and confined her in the
turret of the castle. At dead of night, the maiden heard
steps ascending the stone staircase that led to her apartment,
and fearing the worst, opened a vein in her neck, by means
of her breast-pin, and bled to death. Next morning the fact
was divulged, and great indignation was expressed against
Tyrrell. Turlogh O'Brinn had taken refuge in the pale from
the horrors of war, and hoped to bring up his family in peace,
under the protection of the viceroy. The affliction which
now befel this peaceful chieftain, excited universal sympathy.
At this time, the site of the Royal Hospital, Kilmainham,
was occupied by the Knights of St. John, and one of them,
who, as procurator of the house, had become acquainted with
the family of O'Brinn, resolved that so public a scandal
should not pass unpunished. He consequently assembled his retainers, and marched towards Castleknock. Tyrrell, finding he was to be attacked, declared that he would not
take refuge behind his ramparts, but would meet his enemy
in the open field. A bloody battle ensued, in which Tyrrell
was slain. His tragical end was considered a just punish
ment for his many crimes; but the death of the maiden was
long regretted by the people, and often in the winter's even-
ings, when the rustics gathered round the blazing hearth,
many a tear was shed over the sorrows of O'Brinn, and the
fate of his daughter Eibhleen.

It was long a popular belief, that, at the hour of midnight,
a female figure, robed in white, might be seen moving slowly
round the castle. This, they said, was Eibhleen, and they
called her "The Lady of the Castle."

" When distant chimes sound midnight hour,
The spirit pure is seen;
And moving round the lonely tower,
Looks bright as moonlight beam.
And as the moonbeams tint the walls,
And light the turret's crest,
" 'Twas hence", she says, " my spirit fled,
'Tis here my bones find rest.
And here I wander, year by year,
For such my lot has been,
But soon at end my penance drear,
I'll rest in joy unseen.'"

Her act of suicide, though wholly unjustifiable, was believed to have been palliated by ignorance, and in making the rounds of the castle, she was supposed to be completing her purgatory. The Lady of the Castle has not been seen since the Congregation of St. Vincent got possession of Castleknock; the priests, they say, must have "laid the spirit."

Impact of English Civil War
"COURAGEOUS CONDUCT OF AN IRISH LADY AT THE TAKING OF CASTLEKNOCK"
Castleknock Castle was the scene of many bloody encounters, including this one recounted by an Irish officer in 1642. It was discovered in the Bibliothèque Imperiale, Paris.

A small pamphlet entitled " Courageuse Resolution d'une dame Irlandaise a la prise de Chateau-knock", was lately found by accident in the Bibliothèque Imperiale of Paris.

It occupies only six pages I2mo., and seems to have been a letter written by an Irish officer to some friends in France, very soon after the event took place. It was found at the time so interesting that it was immediately published and circulated through Paris. No name is given, but its date is 1642. It is entered in the Bibliothèque Imperiale, 8vo. No. 955, A. a. It thus commences:

"The Earl of Ormond, a Protestant, went forth from the city of Dublin on the 28th of last month at the head of 4,000-foot and 500 horse towards the county Meath.

"The next day he besieged with his army Castleknock, belonging to the Lady de Lacy, aunt of the Earl of Fingal.
The husband of this lady was engaged in the army of the Catholics of Ireland. He left his wife in the Castle to keep it with fifty men only, being well assured that her courage was above her sex, in which he was not deceived ; for this lady, by the orders which she gave, caused 400 soldiers of the besiegers to be slain during the four days the siege lasted, and the number of dead would have been greater still, had not the ammunition failed, which this lady having perceived, she caused to be put in one heap all her clothes, money, jewels, and precious moveables, in a word, all that was found of any value within the enclosure of the Castle ; she then set fire thereto, so that there should remain no booty for the enemy. She also rendered useless all the arms which were in the place, having caused them to be broken, with the exception of those with which her soldiers were equipped, and in the light of the fire she harangued her soldiers thus:

" My faithful servants, you can well judge by the action I am after performing, what hope there is of favour from our enemies, and how little clemency I expect at their hands. I tell you, moreover, that you should not expect quarter from them, but remember the sentence which says, ' let the vanquished hope for nothing from their enemies.' Take courage, then, and combat to death for the faith of your Redeemer ; you can never find a more glorious end, and the sooner to find it, go valiantly to attack the enemy of the Cross, lest, being made prisoners, any of you should, by bad treatment or the violence of torments, fail in the good resolution you have taken of dying to-day for the Catholic Faith ; in which I desire to set you the example by marching at your head.'

"This done, the besieged set fire to the Castle, and went down, sword in hand, with such resolution that, after a great carnage of their enemies, all that went forth remained dead on the field, with the exception of the lady, who was made prisoner by the Earl of Ormond.

"After this the Earl sent to Dublin for reinforcements, and pursued his march."

Thus terminates this interesting narrative."

General Monk
The castle was partially dismantled after the War of the Three Kingdoms when considerable artillery damage had been done to the castle.

"When the English Parliament proclaimed war upon King Charles, the Irish adhered to the Stuarts, and the lords of Castleknock joining the national movement, planted the royal standard upon their battlements. From that day their doom was fixed.
General Monk marched from Dublin with a strong force and siege train, and sat down before the castle (1642). Things were there in the same state as in the days of the first Tyrrells.
The lofty walls, the deep-set windows, the rooms within low and dimly lighted, and the heavy oak benches around, more like machines. of war than articles of luxury. But the garrison was too weak for the defence. A heavy cannonade commenced, and when the walls were shaken to their foundations, and eighty of the defenders had fallen, the signal was given and the place taken by assault. The garrison had acted bravely, but compassion was far from the hearts of the Republicans. The survivors were tried by court-martial, found guilty of fighting against the state, and hanged from those walls they had so bravely defended.
Monk, on returning to Dublin, left a strong force in the Castle, for, though much shattered, it was still a position of considerable importance. But its days were numbered."

Owen Roe O'Neill
On his march towards Dublin (1647), finding Castleknock in the hands of the English, he determined to dislodge them. An effort was made to avert the blow. Colonel Trevor appeared at the head of a body of cavalry, but these were quickly routed, and O'Neill commenced another siege. This was too much for the veteran fortress, already tottering to its fall; it surrendered, and breathed its last in the hands of the Irish hero.

Present day

The green plot of ground enclosed within the old walls is used as a burial place for the priests of St. Vincent de Paul, and many zealous missioners, cut off in the bloom of life, are there interred. It was a happy thought. That spot, purpled with the blood of many a hero, and containing within its bosom the relics of the " departed brave", is now a consecrated cemetery. Here rest side by side the soldier and the priest of Erin. The one fought for Ireland's temporal interests, the other for her spiritual welfare..

Books
 Dónal MacPolin and Peter Sobolewski, Blanchardstown, Castleknock and the Park, 2001, Cottage Publications 
 James O'Driscoll, Cnucha: A history of Castleknock and district, 1977, privately issued
 Jim Lacey, A Candle in the Window, 1999 Marino Publications 
 Tadhg O'Keeffe, Medieval Irish Buildings, pp 230-231 2015 Four Courts Press

References

External links
History of Castleknock
Excerpt from book on Castleknock by Jim Lacey
Fort of Cnucha and its Successors

Castles in Fingal
Castleknock College
Ruins in the Republic of Ireland
Buildings listed on the Fingal Record of Protected Structures